The Cobar Sound Chapel is a permanent site-specific sound installation, located 1.5 km west of the town of Cobar, in  central Western New South Wales, Australia. 

It is a multi-disciplinary artwork created by composer and sound artist Georges Lentz in collaboration with architect Glenn Murcutt. The Cobar Sound Chapel consists of a five metre concrete cube with an oculus in its ceiling and with loudspeakers in its four walls, cast in situ inside a ten metre tall disused water tank from 1901, and with a pair of 5-by-5-metre entrance walls leading into the tank. 

The Cobar Sound Chapel is the new permanent home of Lentz's digital 24-hour surround-sound "String Quartet(s)" (2000–2022), a composition recorded over many years by Sydney string quartet The Noise. The music is inspired by the outback landscape and its starry night skies. Its vast sound art canvas spills out of the tank day and night, with the inside of the tank visible from outside through a pair of steel gates and dimly lit up at night. Other influences of the artwork include aboriginal dot painting, the art and poetry of William Blake, the graffiti found on the tank's walls, as well as, in some parts, an exploration of AI-generated sound. 
 The Cobar Sound Chapel also includes art in its blue corner windows, created by Cobar Indigenous artist Sharron Ohlsen.

According to composer Georges Lentz, the whole Cobar Sound Chapel is music, a giant "digital string quartet", and there are relationships between the proportions of the building and rhythmic patterns found in the music.

The Cobar Sound Chapel, twenty years in the making, officially opened on April 2, 2022.

Gallery

References

External links 
 Cobar Sound Chapel official website
 "String Quartet(s)" information on Georges Lentz website
 Cobar Sound Chapel on Cobar Shire Council website

Buildings and structures in New South Wales
Cobar
Public art in New South Wales